Mark Waugh is a former Australian cricketer who scored centuries (100 or more runs) in Test and One Day International (ODI) matches organised by the International Cricket Council (ICC). Described by ESPNcricinfo writer John Polack as "one of the world's most elegant and gifted strokemakers", he played most of his career under the captaincy of his older twin-brother Steve Waugh. Waugh represented Australia in 128 Test matches and 244 ODIs between 1988 and 2002, scoring 20 and 18 centuries respectively. He was primarily a batsman who played as an opener in ODIs, while normally at number four in Tests.

Waugh made his Test debut against England at the Adelaide Oval in January 1991, scoring a century; he became the fifteenth player from Australia to score a hundred on debut when he made 138 in the innings. He ended the season with one more century, aggregating 554 runs at an average of 61.55. Following his performances, Wisden Cricketers' Almanack named him as one of their five Cricketers of the Year the same year. Waugh was instrumental in Australia's victory in the 1995 Frank Worrell Trophy against the West Indies when he made 126 in the deciding game. His highest score of 153 not out was achieved against India during the third Test of the 1998 Border–Gavaskar Trophy in Bangalore. In Tests, Waugh was most successful against England scoring six centuries.

Although Waugh made his ODI debut against Pakistan in December 1988, he did not score his first century until four years later. Between his debut and the 1996 World Cup he made five centuries, all against different opponents. Waugh was more prolific at the 1996 World Cup scoring three centuries. Waugh set the record for the highest individual score by an Australian when he made 173 against the West Indies at the Melbourne Cricket Ground in February 2001. The following month he scored a match-winning 133 not out against India at Nehru Stadium in Pune which also became his last century in the format. Despite a slow start to his ODI career, he became the third highest century-maker in ODIs at the time of scoring his last century.

Key 
 *  Remained not out
   Man of the match

Test centuries

ODI centuries

Notes

References 

Australian cricket lists
Lists of international cricket centuries by player